The Island Heights School District is a community public school district that serves students in kindergarten through sixth grade from Island Heights in Ocean County, New Jersey, United States.

As of the 2018–19 school year, the district, comprised of one school, had an enrollment of 129 students and 13.2 classroom teachers (on an FTE basis), for a student–teacher ratio of 9.8:1. In the 2016–17 school year, Island Heights had the 14th-smallest enrollment of any school district in the state, with 126 students.

The district is classified by the New Jersey Department of Education as being in District Factor Group "GH", the third-highest of eight groupings. District Factor Groups organize districts statewide to allow comparison by common socioeconomic characteristics of the local districts. From lowest socioeconomic status to highest, the categories are A, B, CD, DE, FG, GH, I and J.

Public school students in seventh through twelfth grades attend the schools of the Central Regional School District, which also serves students from the municipalities of Berkeley Township, Ocean Gate, Seaside Heights and Seaside Park. As of the 2018–19 school year, the district, comprising two schools, had an enrollment of 2,272 students and 162.8 classroom teachers (on an FTE basis), for a student–teacher ratio of 14.0:1. Schools in the district (with 2018–19 enrollment data from the National Center for Education Statistics) are 
Central Regional Middle School with 769 students in grades 7 - 8 and 
Central Regional High School with 1,483 students in grades 9 - 12. The district's board of education consists of nine members, who are directly elected by the residents of the constituent municipalities to three-year terms of office on a staggered basis, with three seats up for election each year. Island Heights is allocated one of the board's nine seats.

Awards and recognition
Island Heights Elementary School was one of nine schools in New Jersey honored in 2020 by the National Blue Ribbon Schools Program, which recognizes high student achievement.

School
Island Heights Elementary School had an enrollment of 124 students as of the 2018–19 school year.

Administration
Core members of the district's administration are:
Timothy Rehm, Superintendent
Frank Frazee, Business Administrator
Lillian Brendel, Board Secretary

Board of education
The district's board of education, comprised of nine members, sets policy and oversees the fiscal and educational operation of the district through its administration. As a Type II school district, the board's trustees are elected directly by voters to serve three-year terms of office on a staggered basis, with three seats up for election each year held (since 2012) as part of the November general election. The board appoints a superintendent to oversee the day-to-day operation of the district.

References

External links
Island Heights School

School Data for the Island Heights School District, National Center for Education Statistics
Central Regional School District

Island Heights, New Jersey
New Jersey District Factor Group GH
School districts in Ocean County, New Jersey
Public elementary schools in New Jersey